Parliamentary elections were held in Portugal on 22 April 1861.

Results

References

1861
Portugal
1861 in Portugal
April 1861 events